South Korean girl group Apink have released seven studio albums, nine extended plays, three compilation albums, one single album, and thirty-one singles. Formed by A Cube Entertainment, they debuted on April 19, 2011, with the extended play Seven Springs of Apink.

Albums

Studio albums

Compilation albums

Single albums

Extended plays

Singles

Other charted songs

Other appearances

Videography

Video albums

Music videos (Korean)

Music videos (Japanese)

Notes

References 

Discographies of South Korean artists
Discography
K-pop music group discographies